Let's Elope is a lost 1919 American silent comedy film starring Marguerite Clark and directed by John S. Robertson. It was produced by Famous Players-Lasky and released through Paramount Pictures. The film is based on a play by Frederick J. Jackson.

Plot
As described in a film magazine, author Hilary Farrington (Mills) is pressed by his publishers and confines himself to his work so closely that his wife Eloise (Clark) feels herself neglected. Darrell McKnight (Glass), free verse devotee, breaks his engagement to Nora Gail (Greene) and implores Eloise to elope with him. She pretends to agree, meaning to thus bring her husband to the realization of his neglect. Hilary is incredulous but Nora guesses the plan and the two then conspire to bring their respective loved ones back into the fold by seeming to do everything in their power to aid them in eloping. The complications which ensue are many and varied, but Eloise finally grasps the significance of their plans, summons her uncle who is a bishop, gets Nora married to Darrell, and goes on a second honeymoon with her husband.

Cast
Marguerite Clark as Eloise Farrington
Frank R. Mills as Hilary Farrington (*this Frank Mills, stage star born 1870 died 1921)
Gaston Glass as Darrell McKnight
Helen Greene as Nora Gail
Blanche Standing as Maid
George Stevens as Butler
A. H. Busby as Bishop

See More
List of lost films

References

External links

AllMovie.com
lantern slide(archived)

1919 films
American silent feature films
Films directed by John S. Robertson
American black-and-white films
American films based on plays
Paramount Pictures films
1919 comedy films
Silent American comedy films
Lost American films
1919 lost films
Lost comedy films
1910s American films